In mathematics, a well-defined expression or unambiguous expression is an expression whose definition assigns it a unique interpretation or value. Otherwise, the expression is said to be not well defined, ill defined or ambiguous. A function is well defined if it gives the same result when the representation of the input is changed without changing the value of the input. For instance, if  takes real numbers as input, and if  does not equal  then  is not well defined (and thus not a function). The term well defined can also be used to indicate that a logical expression is unambiguous or uncontradictory.

A function that is not well defined is not the same as a function that is undefined.

Example
Let  be sets, let  and "define"  as  if  and  if .

Then  is well defined if .

As a result, the latter  is not well defined and thus not a function.

"Definition" as anticipation of definition
In order to avoid the quotation marks around "define" in the previous simple example, the "definition" of  could be broken down into two simple logical steps:

While the definition in step 1 is formulated with the freedom of any definition and is certainly effective (without the need to classify it as "well defined"), the assertion in step 2 has to be proved. That is,  is a function if and only if , in which case  – as a function – is well defined.

Colloquially, the "function"  is also called ambiguous at point  (although there is per definitionem never an "ambiguous function"), and the original "definition" is pointless.

Despite these subtle logical problems, it is quite common to anticipatorily use the term definition (without apostrophes) for "definitions" of this kind – for three reasons:

 It provides a handy shorthand of the two-step approach.
 The relevant mathematical reasoning (i.e., step 2) is the same in both cases.
 In mathematical texts, the assertion is "up to 100%" true.

Independence of representative
The question of well definedness of a function classically arises when the defining equation of a function does not (only) refer to the arguments themselves, but (also) to elements of the arguments, serving as representatives. This is sometimes unavoidable when the arguments are cosets and the equation refers to coset representatives. The result of a function application must then not depend on the choice of representative.

Functions with one argument
For example, consider the following function

The function  is well defined, because

As a counter example, the converse definition

Operations
In particular, the term well defined is used with respect to (binary) operations on cosets. In this case one can view the operation as a function of two variables and the property of being well defined is the same as that for a function. For example, addition on the integers modulo some n can be defined naturally in terms of integer addition. 

Therefore, 

Well-defined notation
For real numbers, the product  is unambiguous because  (and hence the notation is said to be well defined). This property, also known as associativity of multiplication, guarantees that the result does not depend on the sequence of multiplications, so that a specification of the sequence can be omitted.

The subtraction operation, on the other hand, is not associative.

Division is also non-associative.

Unlike with functions, the notational ambiguities can be overcome more or less easily by means of additional definitions (e.g., rules of precedence, associativity of the operator). For example, in the programming language C the operator - for subtraction is left-to-right-associative, which means that a-b-c is defined as (a-b)-c, and the operator = for assignment is right-to-left-associative, which means that a=b=c is defined as a=(b=c). In the programming language APL there is only one rule: from right to left – but parentheses first.

Other uses of the term
A solution to a partial differential equation is said to be well defined if it is determined by the boundary conditions in a continuous way as the boundary conditions are changed.

See also
 
 Definitionism
 Existence
 Uniqueness
 Uniqueness quantification
 Undefined
 Well-formed formula

References

Notes

Sources
 Contemporary Abstract Algebra, Joseph A. Gallian, 6th Edition, Houghlin Mifflin, 2006, .
 Algebra: Chapter 0, Paolo Aluffi, . Page 16.
 Abstract Algebra, Dummit and Foote, 3rd edition, . Page 1.

Definition
Mathematical terminology